Mitsuhisa (written: 光久) is a masculine Japanese given name. Notable people with the name include:

, Japanese anime producer
, Japanese mixed martial artist
, Japanese footballer

Japanese masculine given names